Erika L. Sánchez (born c. 1984) is an American poet and writer. She is the author of poetry collection Lessons on Expulsion and a young adult novel I Am Not Your Perfect Mexican Daughter, a 2017 finalist for the National Book Award for Young People's Literature. She is a professor at DePaul University.

Early life and education
Sánchez, the daughter of Mexican immigrants, is from Cicero, Illinois. She has two brothers. She grew up bilingual, speaking both Spanish and English. She attended Morton East High School, then the University of Illinois at Chicago, where she was Phi Beta Kappa and graduated magna cum laude. After college she traveled to Madrid, Spain, to teach English with the Fulbright program and pursued poetry. She then earned an MFA in poetry from the University of New Mexico.

Career

Poetry
Sánchez won a Ruth Lilly and Dorothy Sargent Rosenberg Poetry Fellowship in 2015. Her first poetry collection, Lessons on Expulsion, was published by Graywolf in July 2017. The Washington Post named it to a list of best poetry of July 2017, calling it a "fierce, assertive debut". In The New York Times, Kathleen Rooney praised Sánchez's "wrenching explorations of guilt and shame, grief and misogyny...Her depictions of misery hurt and haunt," particularly through her use of the second person "to draw readers close to difficult subjects." In 2017, United States poet laureate Tracy K. Smith recommended Sánchez as among the best new voices in poetry.

Prose
Sánchez's first young adult novel was I Am Not Your Perfect Mexican Daughter. It follows 15-year-old Julia Reyes who first struggles to live up to the rule-following example set by her sister Olga, then begins to learn things were not as they seemed when Olga dies unexpectedly. Bustle named the book to a list of the best 15 young adult books appearing in October 2017 and it was a finalist for the National Book Award for young people's literature. It also won the 2018 Tomás Rivera Award.

In 2021, it was announced that America Ferrera will direct a film adaptation of the novel for Netflix, with a script by Linda Yvette Chávez.

In 2022, her memoir Crying in the Bathroom: A Memoir was published.

For three years, Sánchez also served as the sex and love advice columnist for Cosmopolitan for Latinas.

Teaching
From 2017 to 2019, Sánchez was an arts fellow at Princeton University, teaching poetry and fiction writing. As of 2020, she serves as writer-in-residence at DePaul University, teaching English and writing.

Personal life
Sánchez lives in Chicago.

References

External links
 Official site

21st-century American poets
American writers of Mexican descent
American women poets
Writers from Illinois
Living people
Year of birth missing (living people)
University of Illinois alumni
University of New Mexico alumni
People from Cicero, Illinois
21st-century American women writers
American women novelists